The 386th Tactical Fighter Squadron is an inactive United States Air Force unit. Its last assignment was with the 312th Tactical Fighter Wing, based at Cannon Air Force Base. New Mexico. It was inactivated on 18 February 1959.

History

Operational history
Established in early 1942 as a light bomb squadron, equipped with A-24 Banshees, although equipped with export model A-31 Vengeance dive bombers for training.  Trained under Third Air Force in the southeast United States, also used for antisubmarine patrols over the Atlantic southeast coast and then Gulf of Mexico.

Deployed to Southern California in early 1943 to the Desert Training Center, trained in light bombing while supporting Army maneuvers in the Mojave Desert until October.

Re-equipped with North American A-36 Apache dive bombers and deployed to New Guinea as part of Fifth Air Force.  In the Southwest Pacific the squadron attacked Japanese strong points and tactical positions and targets of opportunity in support of MacArthur's campaign along the north coast of New Guinea; then advancing into the Netherlands East Indies and Philippines as part of the Island Hopping campaign.  Re-equipped with P-40s; then later A-20 Havocs.   Engaged in heavy fighting on Leyte; Mindoro and Luzon in the Philippines during 1944–1945.

The 386th was selected to carry out field operation testing of the Consolidated B-32 Dominator in mid-1945 and made test flights over Luzon and Formosa in June.  The squadron moved to Okinawa in mid-August and after the Atomic Bomb missions had been flown.  It flew several combat operations with the B-32 in spite of the de facto cease-fire that had been called following the bombing of Nagasaki. During this time, the B-32s flew mainly photographic reconnaissance missions, most of which were unopposed.  However, during a reconnaissance mission over Tokyo on 18 August, two B-32s were attacked by Japanese fighters. The American gunners claimed two kills and one probable, but one aircraft was badly shot up and one of her crew was killed with two being injured. This was to prove to be the last combat action of World War II.  After VJ-Day, the surviving B-32 aircraft were ordered to return to the United States, ending the test program. The 386th remained on Okinawa until December until returning to the United States with most personnel demobilizing. It was inactivated as a paper unit on 6 January 1946.

The squadron was reactivated as a B-29 Superfortress unit in the reserves in 1947, but lack of funding and personnel led to rapid inactivation. It transferred to Tactical Air Command in the mid-1950s and activated first with F-86 Sabres, then F-100 Super Sabres in 1958.

The squadron was inactivated in 1959 when its parent 312th Tactical Fighter Wing was inactivated and redesignated as the 27th Tactical Fighter Wing. Personnel and equipment of the squadron were re-designated as the 522d Tactical Fighter Squadron.

Lineage
 Constituted 386th Bombardment Squadron (Light) on 28 January 1942
 Activated on 15 March 1942
 Redesignated: 386th Bombardment Squadron (Dive) on 27 July 1942
 Redesignated: 386th Bombardment Squadron (Light) on 6 December 1943
 Redesignated: 386th Bombardment Squadron (Heavy) on 19 July 1945
 Inactivated on 18 December 1945
 Redesignated: 386th Bombardment Squadron (Very Heavy) on 14 July 1947
 Activated in the reserve on 30 July 1947
 Inactivated on 27 June 1949
 Redesignated: 386th Fighter-Bomber Squadron on 29 July 1954
 Activated on 1 October 1954
 Redesignated: 386th Tactical Fighter Squadron on 1 July 1958
 Inactivated on 18 February 1959.

Assignments
 312th Bombardment Group, 15 March 1942 – 18 December 1945
 Tenth Air Force, 30 July 1947
 312th Bombardment Group, 13 August 1947 – 27 June 1949
 312th Fighter-Bomber Group, October 1954
 312th Fighter-Bomber (later Tactical Fighter) Wing, 8 October 1957 – 18 February 1959.

Stations

 Bowman Field, Kentucky, 15 March 1942
 Will Rogers Airport, Oklahoma, 12 June 1942
 Hunter Field, Georgia, 18 August 1942
 DeRidder Army Airbase, Louisiana, 18 February 1943
 Rice Army Airfield, California, 13 April 1943
 Salinas Army Air Base, California, 13 August – 24 October 1943
 Jackson Airfield (7 Mile Drome), Port Moresby, New Guinea, 30 November 1943
 Gusap Airfield, New Guinea, c. 25 December 1943
 Nadzab Airfield Complex, New Guinea, 12 June 1944
 Hollandia Airfield Complex, Netherlands East Indies, 12 July 1944
 Tanauan Airfield, Leyte, Philippines, 19 November 1944

 McGuire Field, San Jose, Mindoro, Philippines Commonwealth, 26 January 1945
 Mangaldan Airfield, Luzon, Philippines Commonwealth, c. 10 February 1945
 Floridablanca Airfield (Basa Air Base), Luzon, Philippines Commonwealth, c. 20 April 1945
 Yontan Airfield, Okinawa, C. 13 August – 28 November 1945
 Fort Lewis, Washington, c. 13–18 December 1945
 Ellington Field, Texas, 30 July 1947 – 27 June 1949
 Clovis (Later Cannon) AFB, New Mexico, 1 October 1954 – 18 February 1959.

Aircraft
 A-31 Vengeance, 1942–1943
 A-24 Banshee, 1942–1943
 North American A-36 Apache, 1943
 P-40 Warhawk, 1943–1944
 A-20 Havoc, 1944–1945
 B-32 Dominator, 1945
 F-86 Sabre, 1955–1956
 F-100 Super Sabre, 1956–1959.

References

Sources
 Maurer, Maurer (1983). Air Force Combat Units of World War II. Maxwell AFB, Alabama: Office of Air Force History. .

External links

Fighter squadrons of the United States Air Force